Spit Blood is the second EP by American rock band The Atomic Bitchwax, released in March 2002 via MeteorCity.

Track listing

 "Dirty Deeds Done Dirt Cheap" (AC/DC cover) – 4:12
 "Liquor Queen" – 3:59
 "Get Your Gear" – 5:34
 "Cold Day in Hell" – 6:47
 "Spit Blood" – 4:16
 "Black Trans-Am" – 4:11
 "U Want I Should" – 4:19

Critical reception

Reception was overall moderately negative. Reviews positively rated the first song ("Dirty Deeds Done Dirt Cheap") and the last ("U Want I Should") but felt the remaining tracks were poor quality filler, with the music overall of a lower quality than previous music by the band.

References

External links
 

2002 EPs
The Atomic Bitchwax albums